Your New Best Friends is the second album by Ralph Myerz and the Jack Herren Band. There is an untitled hidden track 15 minutes and 20 seconds into track 12.

Track listing
"Kill The Habit"
"Natasha 75"
"L.i.p.s.t.i.c.k."
"Dubspace"
"My Private Night"
"Dr Lovemuscle"
"Vendetta"
"Waiting For You"
"She Was Here"
"Escape From The Island"
"Bergen"
"So Me"       /        untitled Hidden Track @ 15m20s

References

2004 albums
Ralph Myerz and the Jack Herren Band albums
Emperor Norton Records albums